Bare Faced Cheek is the fourth full-length album by the Punk band Toy Dolls.

Lead singer and guitarist Michael Algar is not a fan of the album, recalling that "we've done a few poor records, but I would have to say that Bare Faced Cheek is the worst; it's awful. The sound was poor; my guitar was broken at the time so I had to use the engineer's guitar with a fuzz box thing... and I hate effects pedals! There is one good track on it though, "Yul Brynner Was a Skinhead"."

Track listing
All songs written by Algar

  "Bare Faced Cheek"  – 0:51
  "Yul Brynner Was A Skinhead"  – 2:54
  "How Do You Deal With Neal?"  – 3:07
  "Howza Bouta Kiss Babe??!"  – 2:50
  "Fisticuffs In Frederick Street"  – 3:19
  "A. Diamond"  – 3:24
  "Quick To Quit The Quentin"  – 2:48
  "Nowt Can Compare To Sunderland Fine Fare"  – 3:03
  "Neville Is A Nerd"  – 2:43
  "Park Lane Punch Up"  – 3:44
  "The Ashbrooke Launderette... (You'll Stink, Your Clothes'll Shrink, Your Whites'll Be Black As Ink)"  – 3:29
  "Bare Faced Cheek"  – 0:30

Personnel
 Michael "Olga" Algar - Vocals, Guitar
 Dean (James) Robson - Bass, Vocals
 Martin "Marty" Yule - Drums, Vocals

References

External links
 Full album lyrics
 Bare Faced Cheek page on The Toy Dolls website

Toy Dolls albums
1987 albums